Ford Festival, also known as Ford Festival Time or The James Melton Show, is an hour-long television show, sponsored by Ford Motor Company, hosted by James Melton, and broadcast on NBC Television beginning on April 5, 1951. The final show aired June 26, 1952. This show was replaced by another Ford-sponsored NBC show, Ford Television Theatre, from October 1952 to June 1956.

The show aired:
April 5, 1951 – December 27, 1951, Thursdays 9:00-10:00 p.m. ET
January 3, 1952 – June 26, 1952, Thursdays 9:30-10:30 p.m. ET

See also
1951-52 United States network television schedule
For other TV series sponsored by Ford Motor Company, see Ford Television Theatre, Ford Startime, The Ford Show, and Ford Star Jubilee.

References

External links
The James Melton Show at IMDB
The James Melton Show at ClassicThemes
Episode list at CTVA
 April 26, 1951 episode at Internet Archive

1951 American television series debuts
1952 American television series endings
1950s American variety television series
NBC original programming
Black-and-white American television shows
English-language television shows
Ford Motor Company